= HD 126141 =

Suspected variable star in the constellation Boötes

Observation data Epoch J2000 Equinox ICRS
- Constellation: Boötes
- Right ascension: 14^{h} 23^{m} 06.82149^{s}
- Declination: +25° 20′ 17.4323″
- Apparent magnitude (V): 6.24

Characteristics
- Evolutionary stage: main sequence
- Spectral type: F5V
- U−B color index: −0.03
- B−V color index: +0.38

Astrometry
| Radial velocity (R_{v}) | −7.9±0.5 km/s |
| Proper motion (μ) | RA: −157.573 mas/yr Dec.: +64.773 mas/yr |
| Parallax (π) | 26.0471±0.0299 mas |
| Distance | 125.2 ± 0.1 ly (38.39 ± 0.04 pc) |
| Absolute magnitude (M_{V}) | +3.41 |

Details
| Mass | 1.4 M_{☉} |
| Radius | 1.5 R_{☉} |
| Luminosity | 4.0 L_{☉} |
| Surface gravity (log g) | 4.29 cgs |
| Temperature | 6,753 K |
| Metallicity [Fe/H] | −0.01 dex |
| Rotational velocity (v sin i) | 10.7 km/s |
| Age | 1.4 Gyr |

Other designations
- NSV 6653, BD+25°2770, FK5 3139, HIP 70310, HR 5387, SAO 83321

Database references
| SIMBAD | data |

HD 126141 is a suspected variable star in the northern constellation of Boötes.
